Depressaria jugurthella is a moth in the family Depressariidae. It was described by Hippolyte Lucas in 1849. It is found in Algeria.

References

Moths described in 1849
Depressaria
Moths of Africa